1996–97 Bosnia and Herzegovina Football Cup was the third season of the Bosnia and Herzegovina's annual football cup. The Cup was won by Sarajevo who defeated Željezničar in the final.

Quarterfinals
The matches were played on 30 April 1997.

|}

Semifinals
The first legs were played on 14 May and the second legs were played on 21 May 1997.

|}

Final

See also
 1996–97 First League of Bosnia and Herzegovina

External links
Statistics on RSSSF

Bosnia and Herzegovina Football Cup seasons
Cup
Bosnia